Abdulah Mutapčić (born 1 January 1932) is a Bosnian former politician who was the 4th President of the League of Communists of Bosnia and Herzegovina from May 1988 until 29 June 1989.

He also served as Mayor of Zenica from 1970 to 1974.

Biography
Mutapčić was born on 1 January 1932 in Zenica, Kingdom of Yugoslavia. From 1970 to 1974, he was the Mayor of Zenica.
Later on in his life, Mutapčić severed as the 4th President of the Presidency of the Central Committee of the League of the League of Communists of Bosnia and Herzegovina from May 1988 until 29 June 1989.

It was during his tenure as President of the Central Committee that tensions between the republics of SFR Yugoslavia came to ahead, in which he attempted to navigate SR Bosnia and Herzegovina around the growing tensions between SR Croatia and SR Serbia.

References

1932 births
Living people
Politicians from Zenica
Bosnia and Herzegovina politicians
Mayors of Zenica
League of Communists of Bosnia and Herzegovina politicians
Bosniak politicians
Bosniaks of Bosnia and Herzegovina
Bosnia and Herzegovina Muslims